Leobordea mirabilis is a known species of legume in the family Fabaceae. It is exclusive to Namibia. Its natural habitat is rocky areas.

Originally assigned to the genus Lotononis, it was reassigned to Leobordea in 2011 when Lotonois was restructured.

References

 

Faboideae
Flora of Namibia
Least concern plants
Taxonomy articles created by Polbot
Taxa named by Kurt Dinter